The Bükk Mountains are a section of the North Hungarian Mountains of the Inner Western Carpathians.  Much of the area is included in the Bükk National Park.

Geography

Although Kékes, the highest point in Hungary, is not here but in the nearby Mátra Mountains, the average height of the Bükk Mountains–with more than 20 peaks higher than 900 m–exceeds that of Mátra.  The highest point of Bükk is Kettős bérc (961 m), third highest main peak in Hungary after Kékes and Galyatető.

There are 1115 known caves in the mountain range, including Bányász-barlang (Miner cave, 274 m) and István-lápa (254 m), the deepest caves in Hungary, the archaeologically important Szeleta cave, the Cave Bath (a main tourist attraction of Miskolc-Tapolca), the Anna Cave, and the István Cave.  52 of the caves are protected because of their fauna and microclimate.

The mountain range is also famous for its skiing facilities located around Bánkút. There are a number of maintained ski slopes equipped with several J-bar lifts. The long traditions of skiing – on the racing and recreational levels – in  Bükk are fostered by local enthusiasts constituting the "Bánkút Ski Club" also in charge of operating and developing one of the largest alpine ski centres in Hungary (http://www.bankut.hu).

Gallery

References

Notes

Sources

External links

office miskolc/ARC show your card
Bükk National Park
Marcel Loubens Caving Club
Accommodation in Bükk

Mountain ranges of Hungary
Mountain ranges of the Western Carpathians
Ski areas and resorts in Hungary